The Armorial Wijnbergen, also known as the Wijnbergen Roll, is a medieval French roll of arms. 
It is divided into two parts; the first, dated c. 1265–1270 has 256 coats of arms of the vassals of Louis IX of France (d. 1270) in the Île-de-France; the second part, dated c. 1280, has 1,056 coats of arms (for a total of 1,312) of the vassals of Philip III of France (r. 1270–1285) in his fiefs in the North of France, the Netherlands and the Rhineland.

The armorial is named for the Wijnbergen family, in whose possession it was acquired by the Royal Dutch Society for Genealogy and Heraldry. Its current whereabouts are unknown, but a copy is held in the Royal Library in Brussels (Collection Goethals, ms. 2569).

References

Emmanuel de Boos, Marches d'armes : Berry, t. III, Éditions du Léopard d'Or, 1989 ;
Paul Adam-Even et Léon Jéquier, Un armorial français du milieu du xiiie siècle : L'armorial Wijnbergen, Archives Héraldiques Suisses, 1951, pp. 49-62, 101-110, 1952, pp. 28-36, 103-111.
L'armorial Wijnbergen (1270-1285), Lausanne, Archives héraldiques suisses, 1951-1954

External links
Brian Timms, The Armorial Wijnbergen

Rolls of arms
13th-century manuscripts
Illuminated heraldic manuscripts